Eureka LDS Church Meetinghouse (also known as Old Mormon Meetinghouse) is a historic church at 137 Main Street in Eureka, Utah, United States. The work of architect Richard C. Watkins, it was built in 1902, dedicated the following year, and served as a meetinghouse until 1976. Its construction was funded by local resident John Beck (1843–1913).

The building was restored by the Ferrel Thomas family in 1988.

References

External links
"Old" L.D.S. Church Meetinghouse – Historical Marker Database

Former churches in Utah
Former Latter Day Saint religious buildings and structures
Meetinghouses of the Church of Jesus Christ of Latter-day Saints in Utah
Churches completed in 1902
1902 establishments in Utah
Religious buildings and structures in Juab County, Utah
Buildings and structures in Eureka, Utah